Instant Pot is a brand of multicookers manufactured by Instant Brands. The multicookers are electronically controlled, combined pressure cookers and slow cookers. The original cookers are marketed as 6-in-1 or more appliances designed to consolidate the cooking and preparing of food to one device. The brand has since expanded to include non-pressure slow cookers, sous-vide immersion circulators, blenders, air fryers and rice cookers.

History

In 2009, Robert Wang, Yi Qin, Dongjun Wang, and one other friend, all former employees of Nortel in Ottawa, Canada, started working on designs for the Instant Pot. Robert Wang is credited as the inventor of the Instant Pot. This beginning model operated as a pressure cooker, slow cooker, rice or porridge cooker, yogurt maker, sauté/searing pan, steamer, and food warmer.

In July 2015 the Instant Pot Smart-60 cooker was recalled, affecting about 1,140 units in Canada and the United States. The defect caused electric current to leak, which could potentially shock the product's user. There were four reported instances of this shock before it was recalled.

In 2017 Instant Pot was sold to Cornell Capital, a private equity firm that owns the Pyrex and SnapWare food container brands, for an undisclosed amount of money.

In February 2018, five production runs of Instant Pot Gem 65 8-in-1 Multicookers were recalled because they were overheating and subsequently melting due to a manufacturing issue.

Models 
There are several different models of the Instant Pot.

See also

 List of cooking appliances
 Convenience cooking

References

Inventions
Cooking appliances
Cookware and bakeware
Cooking vessels
Kitchenware brands